Colin Cook may refer to:

Colin Cook (cricketer) (born 1960), English cricketer
Colin Cook (footballer) (1909–?), English footballer
Colin Cook (speedway) (born 1954), English speedway rider